Tabanus fusconervosus is a horse fly in the subfamily Tabaninae ("horse flies"), in the order Diptera ("flies").

Distribution
United States.

References

Tabanidae
Insects described in 1838
Taxa named by Pierre-Justin-Marie Macquart
Diptera of North America